The 1854 United States elections was the midterm election choosing members of the 32nd United States Congress during the middle of Democratic President Franklin Pierce's term. It was part of the transition from the Second Party System to the Third Party System, as the Whigs collapsed as a national party and were replaced by a coalition running on the Opposition Party ticket and the nascent Republican Party.

In the House, Democrats suffered a massive defeat, losing seats to the Opposition Party, and to the American Party; the latter (also known as the Know Nothings) won more seats in the House than any other third party in the history of the chamber. Nathaniel Banks, a member of the American Party and the Free Soil Party, won election as Speaker of the House after a protracted battle, defeating Democrat William Aiken. In the Senate, Democrats retained a strong majority, while the Opposition replaced the Whigs as the second largest party in the chamber.

See also
1854–55 United States House of Representatives elections
1854–55 United States Senate elections

References

1854 elections in the United States
1854
United States midterm elections